Dytaster is a genus of echinoderms belonging to the family Astropectinidae.

The genus has almost cosmopolitan distribution.

Species:

Dytaster aequivocus 
Dytaster agassizi 
Dytaster cherbonnieri 
Dytaster evaulus 
Dytaster exilis 
Dytaster felix 
Dytaster felli 
Dytaster gilberti 
Dytaster grandis 
Dytaster inermis 
Dytaster insignis 
Dytaster intermedius 
Dytaster mollis 
Dytaster nobilis 
Dytaster pedicellaris 
Dytaster rigidus 
Dytaster semispinosus 
Dytaster spinosus 
Dytaster spinulosus

References

Astropectinidae
Asteroidea genera